Thyridolepis mitchelliana  (common name Mulga grass) is a plant in the grass family, found in all mainland states and territories of Australia, except Victoria.

It was first described in 1843 by Christian Gottfried Daniel Nees von Esenbeck as Neurachne mitchelliana, but was transferred to the genus  Thyridolepis in 1972 by Stanley Blake.

The species epithet, mitchelliana, honours Thomas Livingstone Mitchell.

References

External links 
 Thyridolepis mitchelliana occurrence data from Australasian Virtual Herbarium

Flora of Western Australia
Plants described in 1861
Taxa named by Ferdinand von Mueller
Panicoideae